In recent Ahmadi Muslim belief, the Mai Mari da Ashtan (resting place of Mother Mary) is the burial place of Mary, mother of Jesus, at one extremity of Muree in Pakistan.

Ahmadiyya belief
The primary book source for the association of the town of Muree with Mary is found in the German estoric writer Holger Kersten's Jesus lebte in Indien (1982). This in turn was drawn from Ahmadiyya writer Khwaja Nazir Ahmad's Jesus in Heaven and Earth (1952).

This belief is an addition to the teachings of the Ahmaddiyya founder Mirza Ghulam Ahmad's claims, based on his reading of various Hindu and Islamic sources that Jesus survived the crucifixion, came to India and died and is buried in Kashmir. Combining local oral and written accounts of one Yuz Asaf with the Acts of Thomas, Ahmad claimed that Jesus (whom he identified with Yuz Asaf), Thomas the Apostle (held to be Jesus' twin brother), and their mother Mary travelled to India, with Mary dying en route from Taxila at Muree and being buried at Pindi Point there. These ideas were popularised to western audiences by Paul C. Pappas in Jesus' Tomb in India: The Debate on His Death and Resurrection published by Jain Publishing Company, 1991.

The name "Mai Mari da Ashtan" means, literally, the "resting place of Mother Mary", and the site was venerated by Hindus, Muslims, and Christians locally; so much that when the British tried to have the tomb demolished in 1916, to stop people visiting it (because at the time it was next to a defence post built in 1898), public protest caused them to not proceed with the demolition. The tomb itself was renovated in the 1950s through the efforts of an Ahmaddiyya leader Khwaja Nazir Ahmad, author of Jesus in Heaven and Earth. The defence post no longer exists, and instead a television transmitter station, constructed for Pakistan Television Corporation in 1968, stands on the point.

The Ahmaddiya writer Khwaja Nazir Ahmad also claims that the very name of the town, Muree, named Mari in the 19th century, is derived from the name Mary.
However, mountaineer and local historian Farakh Ahmed Khan disputed this in his history of Muree, stating that the name "Mari" was simply the word for an enclosure of land, a dwelling area, akin to the similar Bengali word.

Rejection by scholars
Ahmad's original claims and readings of his sources were rejected immediately by scholars of Islam and Buddhism in his own lifetime. More recent analysis and rejections of the reading include Per Beskow in Jesus in Kashmir: Historien om en legend (1981), Günter Grönbold, in Jesus in Indien (1985) and Norbert Klatt, in Lebte Jesus in Indien?: Eine religionsgeschichtliche Klärung (1988). Even Paul C. Pappas who popularised Ahmad's claims in Jesus' Tomb in India 1991 concludes by rejecting the claims as unfounded.  Khwaja Nazir Ahmad's further claims about Mary in Jesus in Heaven and Earth (1952), as found in Kersten (1982) are also rejected by these writers.

See also 
 Roza Bal
 Tomb of the Virgin Mary

References

What supports what

Sources

Further reading 
 
 
 
  — Forbes reports his experience of trying to find the tomb.

Shrines to the Virgin Mary
Ahmadiyya
Tombs of biblical people